"Last One Standing" is a song recorded by Canadian country music group Emerson Drive.  It was released in January 2004 as the first single from the album What If?.  The song reached #21 on the Billboard Hot Country Singles & Tracks chart.  The song was written by Richard Marx and Fee Waybill.

Chart performance

References

2004 singles
2004 songs
Emerson Drive songs
Songs written by Richard Marx
Songs written by Fee Waybill
DreamWorks Records singles